Wayne Barker (Pretoria), South African visual artist. Barker is based in Johannesburg. He rose to prominence in the late 80s, at the height of political unrest under the Apartheid regime. His work has featured in several global biennales, art fairs and important retrospective exhibitions. He works in various mediums, including but not limited to painting, printmaking, sculpture, video, performance and installation. In addition to collaborations with other artists, Barker has collaborated with the Qubeka Beadwork Studio based in Cape Town, to realise large scale glass beadworks.

Early life 
Barker was born in Pretoria on 27 July 1963 to a white, working-class family at the height of Apartheid. Barker's father was a South African Airforce pilot, later turned commercial pilot and as a result, Barker and his siblings grew up on the Valhalla military base in Pretoria. Valhalla is the oldest Airforce base in the country, functional since 1921. Growing up in the highly conservative atmosphere of Pretoria in the 70s could in some ways be seen as a catalyst and contributing factor to Barker's particularly rebellious and aggressive attack on that exact conservatism. In Artist's Monologue, Barker recounts his childhood:

{{quote|We were absolutely part of a system where you were taught to hate black people," says Barker today. "It was entrenched in virtually every conversation at home." Yet he also recalls family gatherings as "quite real and warm, like there was a sort of gemutlich vibe. You had drunk uncles playing match boxes and singing Sarie Marais and all that stuff.|Wayne Barker – Artist's Monograph, 2000, Chalkham Press}}

Barker and his brother attended Glen High School in Pretoria, before his expulsion in 1976 after being arrested for buying marijuana. In his teens, Barker left home to learn woodcarving on the coast at Nature's Valley in the Western Cape.

In 1983, after having failed art history at Michaelis, Barker returned home to his father's insistence that he join the South African military as three generations of Barker men before him had. To Barker, the SANDF represented everything about a South Africa in which he had no desire or aptitude to participate in. At the time, the tense political climate had seen a previously unknown escalation, and was straining under intense pressure both internationally and from within. The increased resistance to the apartheid regime had resulted in more and more military raids on private residences, and human rights violations. However, despite his unwillingness, Barker's conscription papers eventually arrived and he would find himself back in Pretoria at the Voortrekkerhoogte military base. Those who refused the service were jailed, so if he was to leave he had to be discharged. Over the course of two weeks he choreographed and played a part that eventually led to his being declared unfit for service due to mental instability. Upon his arrival home, Barker was disowned by his parents, and having to make his own way moved to Johannesburg to be an artist wholeheartedly.

 Education 

On his arrival home and the completion of his high school studies, Barker pursued his arts education at the Pretoria Technikon, starting a diploma in Fine Art in 1981 before going on to study towards a BA in fine art from the Michaelis School of Fine Art at the University of Cape Town.

At Michaelis, Barker would begin to question the art making paradigm at school level. Politically, South Africa was undergoing its most turbulent moment thus far, to which Cape Town, according to Barker seemed indifferent. For a sculpture project under the supervision of Michaelis' Neville Dubow, in which students were required to sculpt an "extension of their bodies", Barker absconded from the trend which would see his classmates creating physical extensions and instead opted for the performative. Barker chose instead, to dress up as his lecturer and have his classmates throw tennis balls at him, creating an extension of the man as a tennis court, which Dubow understandably found displeasing. After two years in Cape Town, he would return to Gauteng without his degree and be conscripted into the South African National Defence Force. After his short tenure at the SANDF, and having practiced for a period of time, Barker went on to pursue an honorary postgraduate degree in Fine art at the prestigious École des Beaux-Arts in Marseilles, France in 1998, all the while creating and adding to a body of work that has maintained its social and political relevance in his home country and abroad.

 Career and work 
Barker's name has become synonymous with a rebelliousness and recklessness, mention of which can be found in the accounts of several of his contemporaries, friends and those who would become his audience. Often cited as having a "sex, drugs and rock n roll" approach to fine art, his persona had become a very prominent add-on to his artistic identity. He has been referred to consistently as the enfant terrible of the South African art sphere, possessing simultaneously a profound sensitivity to life and art, bordering on the poetic as well as a deep rooted commitment to the truth or pursuit thereof. It comes as no surprise that over the span of his career, he has offended, scandalized and landed in hot water more than once. The first major controversy and also the event that catapulted Barker into the public eye centred on the 1990 Standard Bank National Drawing Competition in which he had entered a highly unresolved and hurried work under the African name of Andrew Moletsi. As a result, the Moletsi work was shortlisted, where Barker's was not, highlighting the biased, racially motivated judging systems that controlled the selection process.

 The Famous International Gallery 
Barker's Famous International Gallery (FIG) was a turning point in the exhibition of South African contemporary art throughout its existence from 1989 to 1995. An artist-run space, the gallery was a space for younger artists at the time to exhibit their work. The gallery allowed artists to showcase work that most if not all commercial galleries at the time would not touch, creating a platform for political and social subversion in the South African art scene that would prove instrumental. Many of these artists eventually rose to prominence, including Kendell Geers, Minette Vari, Barend De Wet, and Stephen Cohen.

 Coke Adds life 

In 1993, a year after the end of the Mozambican Civil War, Barker created a large scale installation piece at the Everard Read Gallery in Johannesburg entitled Coke Adds Life. Taking its title from a series of television commercials advertising Coca-Cola, the words became something darker than implied by the familiar, cheerful jingle. The installation was inspired by a trip to Mozambique, in which Barker visited a hospital that seemed deserted. Instead of inundated doctors, Barker found, instead, several Coca-Cola vending machines."Walking around Mozambique and going around hospitals and seeing no doctors and seeing coke machines in this war torn country was for me a massive installation of Apartheid so the first installation I made was called Coke Adds Life. If you can get a coke machine in a hospital, can't you get a doctor?" Wayne Barker, 2002

 Nothing Gets Lost in the Universe 

Nothing Gets Lost in the Universe was Barker's third solo show, shown at the F.I.G Gallery in 1995, and later the Gallery Frank Hanel in Frankfurt, Germany. Informed in part by the rise of the Truth and reconciliation commission that was slowly unearthing the dark truths hidden in Apartheid's murky past, the exhibition consisted of latex gloves filled with objects found on the streets of Frankfurt as well as a larger installation of photographs. Barker had long since established his reputation as a flaneur, that is, one who walks the streets of the city collecting objects and experiences. In an adjoining room, a work called 'Zelbst' over 300 portrait photographs of black people in 1970s South Africa, was suspended from the ceiling. The exhibition spoke to the notion of the object on one level, with regards to the latex gloves and their contents – nothing gets lost in the universe, only found under a different set of circumstances, with a particular history and patina attached to it. On another level, the haunting portraits that made up Zelbst spoke to a different sort of sensitivity not wholly unconnected to that shown by the latex glove objects. These were critical of representation, a moment frozen in time, transformed through photography into objects, not dissimilar to the toy guns, pipes and coffee filters found on the streets of Frankfurt. In this way, Barker became the ultimate flaneur, a collector of lived experience, pursuing the idea that history does not forget, and that nothing gets lost in the universe.

 Land and desire – the Pierneef paintings 1990–2015 
In the early 90s, Barker started an investigation that would span over two decades. Taking the work of the Afrikaner nationalist landscape artist, J.H Pierneef (1886–1957), Barker began to disseminate what remains to this day a highly contested issue in South Africa – land, colonialism and ownership."As I understand it, Pierneef was a propagandist for the white view of South Africa" – Wayne Barker 1990

Pierneef's idealised South African landscapes have since been located by art critics and historians as being rooted in a strong Afrikaans nationalist outlook. Where his painting style was revolutionary to the time, his concerns were more aligned to the ideologies of the current, ruling political philosophy. The 'propaganda' Barker speaks of lay in Pierneef's deliberate omission of the existence of any sort of black presence, and his subtle conviction that the magnificent landscapes depicted were the God-given right of the Afrikaner.  Barker would painstakingly recreate Pierneef's landscapes, before introducing other elements to them.  These would be neon dots (which would eventually become something of a calling card), splatters of lacquer paint in neon colour, overlaying images he would pick (nudes, "church ladies", popular logos) in order to elaborate on issues surrounding land, contestation and desire in his own time, post-Pierneef and post-apartheid. The Pierneef series has seen iterations in various media, finding itself translated into print media as well as in his collaborations with the Qubeka Bead Studio in Cape Town.

Barker remains a prolific and active figure in the South African contemporary art sphere, exhibiting regularly with high-profile galleries as well as newer, up and coming ones. In addition to Super Boring (2010), a large scale retrospective of his work at the Standard Bank Galleries in Johannesburg and Polokwane as well as the SMAC Gallery in Cape Town, Barker has had two recent large scale exhibitions of new work at the CIRCA Gallery in Johannesburg. Normal Man (2015) was largely well received by the public and critically. His most recent exhibition, The World that Changed the Image (2016), shown at the Everard Read Contemporary Gallery in Johannesburg, consisted mainly of new works in the medium of screen-printing which Barker had resolved to learn on a recent trip to New York on which he had met a master screen printer. Upon his return to Johannesburg, he purchased all the equipment to establish a functioning screen-printing studio and learnt the medium. All the print works featured in the show were printed in Barker's own studio largely on his own with the help of an assistant.

 Personal life 
Barker lives and works out of his studio in Troyeville, Johannesburg with his wife. He has lived in the area for several years, earning him the affectionate title "the Mayor of Troyeville". He has two daughters.

 Selected exhibitions, collections and bibliography 

Solo
 2016 - The World that Changed the Image, Everard Read Contemporary Gallery, Johannesburg
 2015 - Normal Man, CIRCA Gallery, Johannesburg
 2012 - Love Land, CIRCA Gallery, Johannesburg
 2010
 Super Boring, SMAC Art Gallery, Stellenbosch
 Super Boring, Standard Bank, Polokwane
 Super Boring, Standard Bank Gallery, Johannesburg
 2008 - Heal, UCA gallery, Cape Town
 2005 - Land and Desire, Gerard Sekoto Gallery, Alliance Francaise, Johannesburg
 2003 - Lovers and Gurus, Contemporary Art Space, Caen, France
 2002 - ITS ALL GOOD, Crosspath Culture, New York.
 2001 - Two Cousins, Fig Gallery, London
 1999 - Fin de Ciècle, Nantes, France
 1998
 Kunst is Kinderspielen, Kunsthalle, Krems, Austria
 Beauty in Politics, Millennium Gallery, Pretoria
 All washed Up in Pretoria, Millennium Gallery, Pretoria
 1997
 All Washed Up in Africa, Gallery Frank Hanel, Cape Town
 All Washed Up in Africa, Gallery Frank Hanel, Frankfurt, Germany
 1996 - Nothing Gets Lost in the Universe, Fig Gallery, Johannesburg
 1995 - Nothing Gets Lost in the Universe, Gallery Frank Hanel, Frankfurt, Germany
 1994 - Peace Through Blood, Fig Gallery, Johannesburg
 1993 - Coke Adds Life, Everard Read Contemporary Gallery, Johannesburg
 1992 - Three Bodies of Love, Everard Read Contemporary Gallery, Johannesburg
 1987 - Images on Metal, Market Theatre, Johannesburg

 Group exhibitions 

 2013 - My Joburg, la maison rouge, Paris (F), 20 June – 22 September, Curators: Paula Aisemberg and Antoine de Galbert. On the occasion of the South Africa-France Cultural
 2009 - I Linguaggi del Mondo: Languages of the World, collateral exhibition to  the Venice Biennale, Palazzo Querini Art House, Venice, Italy
 2009 - Great South African Nude Exhibition, Everard Read, Johannesburg
 2009 - History, UCT Gallery, Cape Town, South Africa
 2008 - Collection 10, SMAC Art Gallery, Stellenbosch
 2007 - Sasol wax art award Exhibition, Johannesburg Art Museum
 2006 - Urban Jungle, Afronova, Johannesburg
 2001 - No Logo, Prince Albert Museum, London, UK
 1998
 Kleine Plastiche Triennale, Stuttgart, Germany
 memórias íntimas marcas, Electric Workshop, Johannesburg
 1997
 The World is Flat, installation, Alternating Currents, Trade Routes: History and Geography, 2nd Johannesburg Biennale, Johannesburg, South Africa curated by Okwui, Enwezor, and Octavio Zaya
  All Washed Up Africa in Africa, French Pavilion, Venice Biennale, Italy
 Köln Art Fair, under the Auspices of Frank Hanel Gallery, Frankfurt, Germany
 Frankfurt Art Fair, under the Auspices of Frank Hanel Gallery, Frankfurt, Germany
 Three x Ten, Frank Hanel Gallery, Cape Town
 Future, Present, Contemporary South African Art, Goodman Gallery, Johannesburg
 1996
 Colours, Haus der Kulturen der Welt, Berlin, Germany  – opened by President Nelson Mandela
 Groundswell: Contemporary Art from South Africa, Mermaid Gallery, London
 1995
 Africus, Black Looks White Myths, First Johannesburg Biennale, South Africa curator: Octavio Zaya Africus
 The Laager, First Johannesburg Biennale, Johannesburg
 1995
 Scurvy, New Town Gallery, Johannesburg
 Can Art Exist Alone: Art and Politics, Pretoria Art Museum, Pretoria
 Brown and Green, Pretoria Art Museum, Pretoria
 1993 - Something New Always Comes Out of Africa, Newtown Gallery, Johannesburg
 1992 - Volkskas Atelier, Pietersburg Art Museum, Pietersburg
 1989 - Breaking Down the Wall: Pierneef Series, FIG Gallery, Johannesburg

 Collections 
 Anglo American Collection
 Durban Art Museum
 Gencor Collection
 Iziko South African National Gallery
 Johannesburg Art Gallery
 MTN Collection
 Polokwane Art Museum
 Pretoria Art Museum
 Rand Merchant Bank
 Sanlam collection
 Sasol Collection
 SABC collection
 Sandton Civic Gallery
 Spier
 Standard Bank Gallery
 Wits Art Museum (formerly Gertrude Posel Gallery), University of Witwatersrand

 Catalogs, and articles 

 'Super Boring', 2010, SMAC & Standard Bank Gallery
 'The ID of South African Artists' (catalogue), 2004, Sharlene Khan (ed). Fortis Circus Theatre, Holland
 "Wayne Barker: Artist's Monograph", 2000, Brenda Atkinson (ed)
 "Trade Routes: History and Geography", 1997, Matthew DeBord (ed) Catalogue, 2nd Johannesburg Biennale
 "Contemporary South African Art: The Gencor Collection", 1997, Kendal Geers (ed)
 "Art in South Africa: the future present", 1996, Sue Williamson and Ashraf Jamal (eds)
 "Colours", 1996, Haus der Kulturen der Welt, Catalogu,
 "Africus: First Johannesburg Biennale", 1995, Candice Breitz (ed), Catalogue

 See also  

Official website – Wayne BarkerWayne Barker – Artist's Monograph,'' 2000. Chalkham Press

References

Michaelis School of Fine Art alumni
20th-century South African male artists
21st-century South African male artists
South African contemporary artists
South African male painters
1963 births
People from Johannesburg
People from Pretoria
Living people
Tshwane University of Technology alumni